Pat Denner (1924 – September 25, 2011) was the designer of Vegas Vic.  

Denner was raised in Salt Lake City, and studied commercial drawining and design at the Pratt Institute in New York City.

In 1951, the Young Electric Sign Company in Salt Lake City commissioned Denner to design an illustration for the manufacturing of the neon sign. He also was commissioned to design Wendover Will for The Stateline Casino in West Wendover, Nevada in 1952.

Denner also designed in 1952 the first seat-down menus for Harman Restaurants, home of the  KFC in Salt Lake City and then created the likeness of Col. Harland Sanders for the menus and posterity. Back then the franchise was not established and Harman Restaurants had only two locations in Salt Lake City.

The 1950s were productive and creative for Denner as an art director and graphic designer. From his studio at Denner & Associates located at the corner of Main and Broadway in Salt lake City he handled many of the prestigious accounts of those days, such Walker Bank, Equitable Oil Company, Auerbachs Stores, Harman Restaurants, Dee Restaurants and others. Mr. Denner created oils, watercolors and portraiture for many selected clients like the U.S. Ski and Snowboard Association in Park City and others from his store front studio in Salt Lake City, Utah. Pat Denner died September 25, 2011 in Salt Lake City, Utah at the age of 87.

Mr. Denner was a subject of a documentary, Howdy Pardner! (directed by George Leon - 2007), which is described as being "about Americana, iconography, outdoor advertising, graphic design and its influence in the popular culture".

References

External links 
 Blog devoted to the film, Howdy Pardner!

2011 deaths
Neon artists
1924 births
People from Salt Lake City
Pratt Institute alumni